United Provinces may refer to:

 United Provinces (1937–1950), former province of British India
 United Provinces of Agra and Oudh (1902–1921), former province of British India
 United Provinces of British India (1921–1937), former province of British India
 United Provinces of Central America (1823–1838), former confederal republic in Central America
 United Provinces of Central Italy (1859–1860), short-lived client state of the Piedmont-Sardinia
 United Provinces of Italy (1831), short-lived republic made up of territories of the former Papal State
 United Provinces of New Granada (1810–1816), confederacy formed after the independence of Colombia
 United Provinces of the Netherlands (1581–1795), confederal republic and predecessor state to the Netherlands
 United Provinces of the Río de la Plata (1816–1831), union of provinces in the Río de la Plata region of South America

See also 
 
 United Province of Canada
 United Kingdom (disambiguation)
 United States (disambiguation)